The 2002–03 Elitserien season was the 28th season of the Elitserien, the top level of ice hockey in Sweden. 12 teams participated in the league, and Vastra Frolunda HC won the championship.

Standings

Playoffs

External links
 Swedish Hockey League official site

Swe
1
Swedish Hockey League seasons